Tarkong K. Pedro (died 1979) was a Palauan educator and politician. He served as a member of the Palau District Legislature and the House of Representatives of the Trust Territory of the Pacific Islands.

Biography
In 1958 he was awarded a scholarship to study at the University of Hawaii. He subsequently became principal of Koror Elementary School,  and spent a summer studying at the College of Guam. 

Entering politics, he served in the Palau District Legislature as a representative of Koro until 1972. In April 1970 he defeated Jacob Sawaichi in a by-election for Palau's 10th district seat in the Trust Territory House of Representatives following the resignation of Minoru Ueki. Although he was re-elected in the November 1970 elections, the results of the Palau seats were annulled. However, he was re-elected in the subsequent by-election. He was re-elected again in 1972, but lost his seat to Isidoro Rudimch in the 1974 elections.

He died in hospital in Guam in 1979 whilst travelling to New York City for a meeting of the United Nations Trusteeship Council.

References

University of Hawaiʻi at Mānoa alumni
Palauan educators
Members of the House of Delegates of Palau
Members of the Congress of the Trust Territory of the Pacific Islands
1979 deaths